"Too Much Fun" is a song written by Curtis Wright and Jeff Knight, and recorded by American country music singer Daryle Singletary.  It was released in November 1995 as the third single from his self-titled debut album.  It peaked at number 4 on the U.S. Billboard Hot Country Singles & Tracks chart and at number 10 on the RPM Country Tracks chart in Canada.  American mixed martial artist Chael Sonnen frequently uses this song for his entrance music in the UFC.

Critical reception
Deborah Evans Price, of Billboard magazine reviewed the song favorably, calling it a "fun, uptempo romp." She goes on to say that the track has "lots of energy and is highlighted by some blazing harmonica, and Singletary's voice rides the crest of fun with good-old fashioned down-home charm."

Music video
The music video was co-directed by Steven T. Miller and R. Brad Murano, and premiered in November 1995.

Chart positions
"Too Much Fun" debuted at number 63 on the U.S. Billboard Hot Country Singles & Tracks for the week of December 9, 1995.

Year-end charts

References

1995 songs
Daryle Singletary songs
1995 singles
Songs written by Curtis Wright
Song recordings produced by David Malloy
Song recordings produced by James Stroud
Song recordings produced by Randy Travis
Giant Records (Warner) singles